The England national under-17 football team, also known as England under-17s or England U17(s), represents England in football at an under-17 age level and is controlled by The Football Association, the governing body for football in England. They are currently coached by Ryan Garry.

Competition history

FIFA U-17 World Cup

England reached the quarter-final stage at both the 2007 FIFA U-17 World Cup and 2011 FIFA U-17 World Cup.

In October 2017, England defeated Spain in the final of the 2017 FIFA U-17 World Cup to become World Champions at this age level for the first time. Phil Foden was awarded the Golden Ball for being the best player at the tournament. Rhian Brewster won the Golden Boot for tournament leading goalscorer and the Bronze ball. On 9 May 2019 England were eliminated at the 2019 UEFA European Under-17 Championship in Republic of Ireland, and therefore failed to qualify for the FIFA U-17 World Cup Brazil 2019.

Championship record

UEFA European Under-17 Championship

The England under-17 team competes in the annual UEFA European Under-17 Championship. England were the hosts of the 2001 Final Tournament, with the English reaching the semi-finals where they lost 4–0 to France on 3 May. They finished fourth, losing the third place play off match 4–1 to Croatia. They finished third at the 2002 UEFA European Under-17 Championship in Denmark. Forward Wayne Rooney was awarded the Golden player accolade. England finished fourth at the 2003 and 2004 tournaments. The 2007 tournament in Belgium saw England finish runners up to Spain, the only goal of the final at the Stade Luc Varenne scored by Bojan Krkić.

England defeated Spain at the 2010 UEFA European Under-17 Championship to become Champions at under-17 level for the first time. Forward Connor Wickham scored the winning goal in the final and was subsequently named Golden player of the tournament. This was the first time England had won a European men's age-group title since their victory at the 1993 UEFA European Under-18 Championship. England won their second title at the 2014 UEFA European Under-17 Championship, defeating the Netherlands in the final on Penalties.

They finished runners up at the 2017 UEFA European Under-17 Championship, losing to Spain in the final on a penalty shoot-out. Forward Jadon Sancho was named Golden player.

The 2018 UEFA European Under-17 Championship was hosted by England. They were eliminated at the semi-final stage by the Netherlands in a penalty shoot-out.

Championship record

Other tournaments
England have also competed at the Nordic tournament and Algarve Tournament.

England host an annual FA international tournament.

Fixtures and results 2022–23 season

Friendlies

2023 UEFA European Under-17 Championship

Qualification

Players

Latest squad
For the 2022–23 season players born on or after 1 January 2006 are eligible. Players born between January and August 2006 are first-year scholars in the English academy system, players born from September 2006 to August 2007 will be eligible to enter the full-time academy system at the start of the 2023–24 season.

The following players were named in the squad for qualifying games against Lithuania, Georgia and Israel, to be played between 25-31 October 2022.

Recent call-ups
The following players have previously been called up to the England under-17 squad and remain eligible.

Honours
FIFA U-17 World Cup Winners (1): 2017
UEFA European Under-17 Championship Winners (2): 2010, 2014
Algarve Tournament Winners (3): 2007–08, 2009–2010, 2011–2012
Nordic Tournament Winners (2): 2009–2010, 2010–2011
FA International U17 Tournament Winners (2): 2010–2011, 2011–2012

References

External links
 Official FA England Under-17 website
 Uefa Under-17 website

17
European national under-17 association football teams